Domremy, Saskatchewan  is a special service area in the Rural Municipality of St. Louis No. 431, in the Canadian province of Saskatchewan. It held village status prior to December 31, 2006. The population was 124 people in 2006. Domremy is located on Highway 320 near Highway 2 and Highway 225 in central Saskatchewan. Domremy had a post office established as early as May 1, 1896 in the District of Saskatchewan, NWT.

Domremy is named after the French village of Domrémy, which was the birthplace of Joan of Arc.

Demographics 

Area statistics 
Lat (DMS) 52° 47' 00" N
Long (DMS)105° 44' 00" W
Dominion Land Survey SE Sec.17, Twp.44, R.26, W2
Time zone (cst) UTC−6

Notable residents 
Stan Hovdebo (1979–1993)

Further reading 
Title: Harvest of Memories, 1895-1995 
Domremy, Sask. : Domremy Historical Society, 1995
vi, 710 p. : ill. ; 29 cm

See also 
List of communities in Saskatchewan
List of hamlets in Saskatchewan

References

External links 
2006 Community Profiles 

Designated places in Saskatchewan
Former villages in Saskatchewan
Special service areas in Saskatchewan
St. Louis No. 431, Saskatchewan
Populated places disestablished in 2006
Division No. 15, Saskatchewan